Zhutang Township is a rural township in Changhua County, Taiwan. It has a population total of 14,353 and an area of 42.1662 square kilometres.

Administrative divisions
 Zhuyuan Village
 Zhutang Village
 Xiaoxi Village
 Minjing Village
 Wuzhuang Village
 Shujiao Village
 Tiantou Village
 Xinguang Village
 Xiqi Village
 Zhulin Village
 Tuku Village
 Neixin Village
 Zhangan Village
 Yongan Village

References

Townships in Changhua County